Charles Ackroyd Hammand (born 9 May 1888) was a rugby union player who represented Australia.

Hammand, a lock, was born in Waverley, New South Wales and claimed a total of two international rugby caps for Australia. Both his Test appearances were on the 1908–09 Australia rugby union tour of Britain, in the first touring Wallaby squad.

References

                   

Australian rugby union players
Australia international rugby union players
People educated at Sydney Grammar School
1888 births
Year of death missing
Rugby union players from Sydney
Rugby union locks